Justice Keller may refer to:

James E. Keller, associate justice of the Kentucky Supreme Court
Michelle M. Keller, associate justice of the Kentucky Supreme Court

See also
Thomas F. Kelleher, associate justice of the Rhode Island Supreme Court